Clyde Louis Duncan, Jr. (February 5, 1961  – February 16, 2015) was a professional American football wide receiver in the National Football League (NFL). He played two seasons for the St. Louis Cardinals in 1984 and 1985, finishing his career with 4 receptions.

Early life 
Duncan attended Potomac High School, in Oxon Hill, Maryland. Playing at both receiver and tailback for Potomac's football team, he accumulated 2,209 yards his senior year, including 958 yards receiving and 808 yards rushing, and was named a high school All-American by Football News and the Maryland Player of the Year by the Washington Pigskin Club.

Duncan played college football at Tennessee from 1979 to 1983. Along with teammates Willie Gault, Anthony Hancock, Lenny Taylor and Tim McGee, he helped create the school's reputation as "Wide Receiver U."  He played sparingly in 1979, redshirted in 1980, played as a defensive back in 1981, and played primarily as a reserve receiver in 1982.  In 1983, however, he led the team in receiving with 33 catches for 640 yards and six touchdowns.  He caught touchdown passes of 80 yards and 57 yards in Tennessee's 41-34 win over Alabama, and his 85-yard touchdown catch against Vanderbilt remains the third-longest in school history. He attracted close attention from scouts for his workout performance at the 1983 Blue–Gray Football Classic.

Professional football career 
Duncan was selected in the first round of the 1984 NFL Draft by the Cardinals. Duncan's rookie year was disrupted by a contract dispute, and he did not sign with the Cardinals until September 10. He soon separated his shoulder, sending him to the injured reserve list. In 1985, Duncan did work his way into the lineup, but caught only four passes on the season and lost his role as third receiver. The Cardinals released Duncan on August 18, 1986. Duncan was subsequently acquired by the Cleveland Browns in the spring of 1987, but he was released at the start of preseason and did not appear in another NFL game. 

He died at the age of 54 in 2015.

References

1961 births
2015 deaths
People from Oxon Hill, Maryland
Players of American football from Maryland
American football wide receivers
Tennessee Volunteers football players
St. Louis Cardinals (football) players
National Football League replacement players